Kyoto is an album by Art Blakey's Jazz Messengers, recorded in 1964 and released on the Riverside label.

Reception
The Allmusic review by Scott Yanow awarded the album 3 stars stating "this is one of literally dozens of recommended Jazz Messengers recordings".

Track listing
 "The High Priest" (Curtis Fuller) - 5:55     
 "Never Never Land" (Betty Comden, Adolph Green, Jule Styne) - 5:50     
 "Wellington's Blues" (Art Blakey) - 5:03     
 "Nihon Bash" (Sadao Watanabe) - 8:30     
 "Kyoto" (Freddie Hubbard) - 7:03

Personnel
Art Blakey - drums
Freddie Hubbard – trumpet
Curtis Fuller – trombone  
Wayne Shorter - tenor saxophone
Cedar Walton - piano
Reggie Workman - bass
 Wellington Blakey - vocals (track 3)

References 

https://www.allmusic.com/album/kyoto-mw0000315032

Art Blakey albums
The Jazz Messengers albums
1966 albums
Riverside Records albums
Albums produced by Orrin Keepnews